Milk 'N' Cookies was an American power pop band from Long Island, New York. Active during the 1970s, a particularly fertile and creative period in the suburban New York music scene, the band had a loyal following of fans attracted to their unique sound.  While many other New York metro-based bands of the time, such as Ramones and Blue Öyster Cult, had edgier personas and harder sounds, Milk 'N' Cookies crafted a more wholesome, pop sensibility. Although they did not receive the radio airplay and attention from mainstream labels given to many of their peers, they were influential in their time and have since achieved considerable cult fame for contributions in the cross-section of pop, glam, and proto-punk.

History 
Milk 'N' Cookies was formed in early 1973, when Ian North, an aspiring artist and singer/guitarist from Woodmere, New York, met the guitarist Jay Weiss, who—despite being the better guitarist of the two—opted to switch instruments when the band was unable to find a bassist. The two became best friends and, after recruiting drummer Mike Ruiz, began shopping a demo tape North recorded on a four-track TEAC. At the band's first show as Milk 'n' Cookies, eventual lead singer, Justin Strauss, shook a tambourine and sang back-ups. "After the show a few people told me it didn't look right," North noted, "either he should be the lead singer or he should get off the stage." North relinquished lead vocals and Strauss's position was cemented.

Milk 'N' Cookies quickly found an audience, playing at Long Island and New York bars, clubs, high school dances, and in 1974, for Sparks' manager, John Hewlett. Hewlett agreed to take the band on, and later played an instrumental role in flying the band to England to record with producer Muff Winwood, but only upon the condition that Weiss be replaced by Sal Maida, a bassist who had previously played with Roxy Music. Without hesitation, North dismissed Weiss from the group. Decades later, he would write that "the guilt of that has weighed on my conscience ever since."

The first single from the album, "Little, Lost And Innocent" backed with "Good Friends", was released by Island Records, but when it failed to chart and the label could not figure out how to market the band, the album's release was indefinitely postponed. When Island offered Ian North a solo deal, he left Milk 'N' Cookies and moved to London, forming a new group called Ian's Radio, which eventually became Neo. By this time, Sal Maida had quit the group as well, to play with Sparks.

It was not until the Sex Pistols arrived that Island felt they had a way to market the Milk 'N' Cookies album: as punk. But while the band's robust live sound (preserved in a 14-song live bootleg recorded at CBGB) certainly came closer to the punk music played by other bands with which they shared bills at clubs like CBGB and Max's Kansas City, their image was that of "well-scrubbed all-American boys who would not have looked out of place in the pages of a vintage Tiger Beat."

Without North, who up to this point had written all of the band's music and lyrics, the remaining members of Milk 'n' Cookies recorded a few more demos, but no further material was released.

Reunion 
2005 marked the start of a period of renewed interest in Milk 'N' Cookies. That year the band reunited to play the Radio Heartbeat Power Pop Fest in Brooklyn. The performance coincided with a reissue of their singular album by RPM Records, who also reissued solo material from Ian North's post–Milk 'N' Cookies period. North, however, was not present for the reunion set or any ancillary press or promotional events.

In 2008, Radio Heartbeat reissued the album yet again.

On January 24, 2016, Captured Tracks released a three-album box set, including the band's original album, two LPs of rare unreleased demos, and a 100-page hardcover book with liners by members of Sonic Youth, Talking Heads, Ramones, Milk 'N' Cookies, and others. However, the book does not include any contributions from North, the band's songwriter, lyricist, lead guitarist, and co-founder. North took to his blog to share his memories of the band's formation and trajectory, and to correct several points he felt were important to the band's history.

Primarily, North lamented the limited consideration given to founding member Jay Weiss, who he credited not only with the band's name, but as being the first person to take him seriously as a musician. "Without Jay," North writes, "I would never have been able to put together a band to play my songs." While the reissue gives little credit to Weiss's contributions, it does credit him as the guitarist on the demo recordings. According to North, however, North was the one playing guitar on those tracks. "Jay was much better than that," he notes, "and I recognize my own guitar playing when I hear it."

Death 
On February 28, 2021, Ian North died at the age of 68 from complications following a heart attack.

Discography 
Milk 'N' Cookies LP (Island Records)
Milk 'N' Cookies Triple LP (Captured Tracks)

References

External links 
Milk 'N' Cookies 3xLP from Captured Tracks
"Ian's History of the Band"
 

1973 establishments in New York (state)
2008 disestablishments in New York (state)
American power pop groups
Musical groups from Long Island
Musical groups established in 1973
Musical groups disestablished in 2008